Royal Charleroi Sporting Club, often simply known as Charleroi or Sporting Charleroi, is a Belgian football club based in the city of Charleroi, in the province of Hainaut. Charleroi plays in the Belgian Pro League and their current spell at the highest level in Belgian football has started in the 2012–13 season. Charleroi was founded in 1904 and they first reached the first division in 1947–48. Their highest finish was runner-up in the 1968–69 season. They have also twice reached the Belgian Cup final, losing in 1977–78 to Beveren and in 1992–93 to Standard Liège.

Sporting Charleroi have a long-standing rivalry with their crosstown rival ROC de Charleroi-Marchienne, currently playing in the third division. Charleroi play their home matches at the Stade du Pays de Charleroi, which was refurbished for the UEFA Euro 2000. The stadium hosted 3 group stage games in the Euro 2000 among which the 1–0 victory of England against Germany. Charleroi have been recruiting several French players in recent years, including Michaël Ciani, Cyril Théréau and goalkeeper Bertrand Laquait.

History
Charleroi Sporting Club was founded in 1904 and they received the matricule n°22. Twenty years after their foundation, they qualified to play in the Promotion (then the second level in Belgian football) and in 1929, the club changed its name to Royal Charleroi Sporting Club. Rivals from Olympic Charleroi were playing in the first division in the late 1930s and the 1940s, while Sporting Charleroi was playing one level down, until they promoted in 1947. In 1949, Sporting Charleroi finished 4th (2 points behind Standard Liège) whereas Olympic Charleroi was 14th. But Olympic took the lead again until 1955 and their relegation to the second division. At the end of the 1956–57 season, Olympic Charleroi had promoted to the first division but Sporting Charleroi finished last in the first division and was thus relegated to the second division.  A spell of 9 seasons in the second division followed and in 1966–67 Sporting Charleroi was back at the top level. They finished at the second place in 1968–69 5 points behind Standard Liège but within two years they were relegated again.

In 1974 the first division was changing from 16 to 20 teams and Sporting Charleroi was chosen to play at the top level.  Olympic Charleroi promoted too as they had won the second division right before but they remained at the top level for just one season.  Sporting underwent a new relegation in 1979–80 (17th on 18) but was back five years later.  Their best result since then in the first division is a 4th place in 1993–94. In September 2005, the G-14 took FIFA to court over the eight-month injury incurred by Abdelmajid Oulmers whilst on international duty with Morocco.

Colours and badge
The colours of Charleroi are black and white with a shirt generally striped, which led to the team being nicknamed The Zebras.

Stadium

The actual ground was baptized in 1939 with a match Sporting-Union du Centre and it was located near the coal mine named Mambourg.  In 1985 the stadium was slightly modernized as the club had qualified for the first division.  It was then heavily renewed in the late 1990s in view of the 2000 European Football Championship. The name changed on 24 May 1999 from Stade du Mambourg to Stade du Pays de Charleroi.  During the tournament, the full capacity of the stadium was up to 30,000 seats. The Stade du Pays de Charleroi hosted notably the match between Germany and England. The highest stand was eventually reduced and the capacity is now 15,000.

Honours
Belgian First Division
Runners-up: 1968–69
Belgian Second Division
Winners: 1946–47, 2011–12
Runners-up: 1965–66
Belgian Second Division play-offs
Winners: 1985
Belgian Cup
Runners-up: 1977–78, 1992–93

European record

Overview
Correct as of May 2016

Matches

Current squad

On loan

Club officials

Coaches

 Jiří Sobotka (1968–69)
 Lukas Aurednik (1969–71)
 Léopold Anoul (1974–75)
 Jean-Paul Colonval (1975–76)
 Aimé Anthuenis (1 July 1987 – 30 June 1989)
 Georges Heylens (1990–92)
 Luka Peruzović (1 July 1991 – 30 June 1992)
 Robert Waseige (1 July 1992 – 30 June 1994)
 Georges Leekens (1 July 1994 – 30 July 1995)
 Luka Peruzović (1 August 1995 – 30 June 1997)
 Robert Waseige (1 July 1997 – 1999)
 Luka Peruzović (1999 – 8 December 1999)
 Raymond Mommens (1999–00)
 Manu Ferrera (2000)
 Enzo Scifo (2001–02)
 Dante Brogno (November 2002 – 3 October 2003)
 Robert Waseige (15 October 2003 – 26 April 2004)
 Jacky Mathijssen (26 April 2004 – 30 June 2007)
 Philippe Vande Walle (1 July 2007 – 10 December 2007)
 Thierry Siquet (11 December 2007 – 9 December 2008)
 John Collins (15 December 2008 – 30 June 2009)
 Stéphane Demol (2009)
 Jacky Mathijssen (2009)
 Stéphane Demol (1 July 2009 – 1 November 2009)
 Tommy Craig (20 November 2009 – 14 April 2010)
 Jacky Mathijssen (1 July 2010 – 20 September 2010)
 Csaba László (23 September 2010 – 17 March 2011)
 Zoltan Kovacs (interim) (24 March 2011 – 4 April 2011)
 Luka Peruzović (4 April 2011 – 30 June 2011)
 Jos Daerden (1 July 2011 – 26 September 2011)
 Tibor Balogh (27 September 2011 – 22 February 2012)
 Mario Notaro (interim) (23 February 2012 – 5 March 2012)
 Dennis van Wijk (5 March 2012 – 12 June 2012)
 Yannick Ferrera (14 July 2012 – 14 February 2013)
 Luka Peruzović (interim) (14 February 2013 – 13 March 2013)
 Mario Notaro (interim) (March 2013 – 13 April 2013)
 Felice Mazzu (1 June 2013 – 3 June 2019)
 Karim Belhocine (1 July 2019 –30 June 2021)
 Edward Still (1 July 2021 -22 October 2022)

References

External links

  Official Website
  Charleroi SC at UEFA.com
 Charleroi SC at EUFO.DE
 Charleroi SC at Weltfussball.de
 Charleroi SC at National Football Teams.com
 Charleroi SC at Football-Lineups.com

 
Association football clubs established in 1904
Football clubs in Belgium
R. Charleroi S.C.
1904 establishments in Belgium
Belgian Pro League clubs